Amal Hamrouni (born 16 June 1995) is a Tunisian handball player for ASF Sfax and the Tunisian national team.

She participated at the 2015 World Women's Handball Championship.

References

1995 births
Living people
Tunisian female handball players
Place of birth missing (living people)
Mediterranean Games competitors for Tunisia
Competitors at the 2022 Mediterranean Games